Cobalt is an American black metal band from Greeley, Colorado, founded in 2002. Cobalt have toured extensively in the US and Europe, including  performances at Roadburn Festival in Tilburg, Netherlands and Maryland Deathfest.

Background
Cobalt began as a solo project of Phil McSorley, under the name Grimness Enshroud, who released one demo. Childhood friend Erik Wunder then joined the band and the name was changed to Cobalt in 2002. The name Cobalt was chosen because, in the words of Wunder, "we wanted a name that didn't entail anything. Something basic. Something elemental. The name 'Cobalt' leaves room for any variety of directions". Wunder drums and performs all of the guitars and bass on the studio albums, and performs the drums live. McSorley provided vocals until 2015, when he split with the band due to personal differences. Mcsorley was replaced by Chicago's Charlie Fell, who is the current front man and vocalist for Cobalt. Wunder and Fell met during the Jarboe/Nachtmystium European tour in 2010.  Fell formerly played bass and vocals in black sludge metal band Lord Mantis. Aside from being in Cobalt, Phil McSorley has served tours of duty with the U.S. army in Iraq and South Korea, while Wunder fronts folk band Man's Gin and plays in experimental singer Jarboe's band.

Debut and Eater of Birds
The first album, War Metal, was mostly raw and primitive black metal, with the occasional hint of what Cobalt was to become. The following album, Eater of Birds, has been cited as "a great step in the bands evolution". Aside from being inspired by early 1990s black metal, the album embraced such influences as Neurosis and Swans, with Jarboe (of Swans) making guest appearances on Cobalt's last two albums. Eater of Birds has been described as featuring "70 minute monolith of blasting war metal, massive thrash riffs, drawn-out crescendoes and ritualistic interludes". Both albums were out of print for years and commanded high prices on webstores such as eBay, but in April 2013 Eater of Birds was reissued by Profound Lore.

Gin
The follow up to Eater of Birds, Gin, further cemented the duo as one of the very best forward thinking, envelope shredding purveyors of black metal that the US has to offer. It was released in 2009 to critical acclaim, being described as "an album that truly, viscerally expanded the possibilities of black metal, both musically and thematically". Among other accolades it was voted as the second best album of 2009 by Terrorizer. The album was largely inspired by two literary figures, Ernest Hemingway and Hunter Thompson. The front cover features a young Hemingway in army uniform, whereas the back cover has a bloated and aged Hemingway brandishing the same shotgun that he took his life with. A picture of Thompson shooting his typewriter is in the center of the inlay.

Slow Forever
McSorley has stated that the band plan on recording a new album following their East Coast tour in May 2013, and that it will be entitled Slow Forever.

On March 17, 2014, McSorley announced via the band's Facebook page that he was quitting Cobalt. He gave Wunder his blessings to continue with the project, if Wunder so chooses. A month later McSorley announced that he and Wunder would indeed be recording Slow Forever together and that their differences had been settled.

On December 16, 2014, Wunder announced via Cobalt's Facebook page that, once again, McSorley was out of the project due to certain personal differences and viewpoints expressed that aren't agreeable to the band.

On June 23, 2015, Cobalt revealed that Wunder was officially in the studio and actively recording Slow Forever, with a tentative release date of early 2016.  Two days later, Cobalt also revealed on their Facebook page the identity of its new vocalist.  Charlie Fell (ex-Lord Mantis) will be contributing to the new album.  It was confirmed on 26 January 2016, that the new album will be released on 25 March 2016, via Profound Lore Records, and will be a double album.

Discography
Hammerfight demo (2003)
War Metal (2005, From Beyond Productions)
Eater of Birds (2007, Profound Lore)
Landfill Breastmilk Beast EP (2008, Profound Lore)
Gin (2009, Profound Lore)
Slow Forever (2016, Profound Lore)

References

American black metal musical groups
Heavy metal duos
Profound Lore Records artists